Sutan Sjahrir Air Force Base, formerly Tabing Airport , is a military air base in Padang, Indonesia. Tabing Airport was West Sumatra's primary airport for civil aviation prior to the opening of Minangkabau International Airport on 22 July 2005. Tabing Airport is now used by the Indonesian Air Force, renaming it after Sutan Sjahrir, Indonesia's first prime minister.

Incidents and accidents
 On 13 October 2012, a Sriwijaya Air Boeing 737, operating as Sriwijaya Air Flight 21 bound for Minangkabau from Medan, accidentally landed at the airport. None of its 96 passengers and 4 crew were injured, and both pilots were subsequently suspended and questioned by the NTSC.

References

External links

Airports in Sumatra
Buildings and structures in West Sumatra
Transport in West Sumatra
Indonesian Air Force bases